Austafjord is a small village in the municipality of Nærøysund in Trøndelag county, Norway. Austafjord sits about half-way between the nearby villages of Garstad and Valøya. Austafjord has a population of about 30, as well as a shop, a school, and a day-care center. Austafjord is the western terminus of Norwegian County Road 770.

References

Villages in Trøndelag
Nærøysund
Vikna